Mothparja (Sindhi: موٿپارجا, Urdu: موتھپارجا) also called Village Muhammad Moryal Sahito (Muhammad Moryal Sahito Jo Goth) is a village in district Khairpur in Sindh province of Pakistan. It has three sub-villages (Mohala). Most of the people in the village are Sahita, but some others are Channa. This village is located 2 km away from National Highway 5 and 1 1/2 km away from Rasoolabad town. It is basically an agricultural village except some villagers who have government jobs.

Etymology 
The word "Mothparja" is the combination of two Sindhi words {Mothparja=Mot(Death:موت)+Par(Cross:پار)=To cross the death: موت پار ڪرڻ}. Legend has it that about two hundred years ago the villagers of this village were living near the shrine of a famous saint. There was a disease epidemic which killed a number of people. Due to this the villagers left there and came to reside here. The people who were safe had crossed the death, meaning they had been saved.

The village is also known as Village Muhammad Moryal Sahito, after the first head of the village. The name Moryal Sahito was given to the village after the independence of Pakistan and is only used in revenue of fields.  For all other proposes the name Mothparja is used.

History 
The history of this village is about 2-3 hundred years old. In early ages there were only 2-3 houses located approximately 500m far from the current village.

18th century
At the end of the 18th century some people came to live near the shrine of a saint. The people were the ancestors of the villagers of this village. There were only 2-3 houses. They were Sahito by caste. Their houses were made from wood and leaves of date palm trees. Around their houses there was only a big dense forest.

19th century
In the beginning of the 19th century  there came a flood in Sindh which destroyed all the houses in the village but still the villagers were safe and sound. Then they migrated from there and settled near a shrine of a saint. They lived there many years but they didn't adopt much change.

20th century
In the first years of the 20th century a pandemic (virus) attacked the village and killed a number of people. So, the head of the village, Muhammad Moryal Sahito, decided to leave that place. After that they migrated from there and settled here,where now the village is. When they came here already a group of people was living here called Mangi. After the independence of Pakistan from British Government a group of people migrated from the Khan Wahan village and settled here,they were Channa.

Geography

Climate
Mothparja has a hot desert climate (Köppen climate classification BWh), characterised by extremely hot and hazy summers with warm winters.Mothparja is known for its extremely hot summer. Wind speed is low throughout the year, and sunshine is abundant. Summer temperatures regularly surpass . Dry heat is experienced starting April to early June until the Monsoon season starts to arrive. Monsoons in Mothparja are not very wet, but bring high dew points, resulting in high heat indices. Monsoons recede by September, but it is not until late October that the short lived autumn season is experienced before the onset of the region's cool winters.

Education 
Before the independence of Pakistan, residents of the village used to get only informal education i.e. Quranic lessons which were given by a hired Mullah in the Mosque. There were no educational facilities even there was not a single school in the vicinity or nearby villages. But without secondary education, and awareness about English language or formal education village would not develop. So, some villagers of this village went on a journey to get knowledge and do something for this village. After completing their education they came to their village and struggled to build a school in the village. After their tireless efforts they made it and in 1980s the boys primary school was built by Sindh Government. After this a girls primary school was also built. In those days only some children went to school (most of boys). Slowly and gradually people started to send their children to school. In 2000s the boys primary school was rebuilt.

There are two schools in Mothparja:
 Government Boys Primary School 
 Government Girls Primary School

Gallery

References

External links 

 

Villages in Sindh
Populated places in Khairpur District